Rhythm, Sound and Movement is a remix album released in 2009 by the New Zealand electronica duo, Pitch Black.

Track listing
1000 Mile Drift (International Observer rmx)
Transient Transmissions (Deep Fried Dub rmx)
Rude Mechanicals (Mistrust rmx)
Bird Soul (Fold vs. Horace rmx)
Bird Soul (Subtone rmx)
Sonic Colonic (Patch rmx)
South of the line (Bluetech rmx)
Harmonia (Neon Stereo rmx)
Please Leave Quietly (Johnny Hooves rmx)
Bird Soul (Kerretta rmx)
1000 Mile Drift (Simon Flower rmx)
Harmonia (Rob rmx)
Fragile Ladders (Groove Yantra rmx)
Please Leave Quietly (Friends Electric rmx)

Pitch Black (band) albums